Odostomia solidula is a species of sea snail, a marine gastropod mollusc in the family Pyramidellidae, the pyrams and their allies.

Distribution
This species occurs in the following locations:
 Caribbean Sea
 Cuba
 Gulf of Mexico
 Jamaica
 Mexico
 Puerto Rico

References

External links
 To Biodiversity Heritage Library (6 publications)
 To Encyclopedia of Life
 To World Register of Marine Species

solidula
Gastropods described in 1850